The 1971–72 Sheffield Shield season was the 70th season of the Sheffield Shield, the domestic first-class cricket competition of Australia. Western Australia won the championship. A new points system was introduced.

Table

Statistics

Most Runs
John Inverarity 641

Most Wickets
Ashley Mallett 45

References

Sheffield Shield
Sheffield Shield
Sheffield Shield seasons